Steven Cramer (born July 24, 1953 Orange, New Jersey) is an American poet.

Life
He graduated from Antioch College, and University of Iowa.

He taught at Bennington College, Boston University, Massachusetts Institute of Technology, and Tufts University.  He teaches at Lesley University.

His work appeared in Antioch Review, The Atlantic Monthly, The Nation, The New Republic, The Paris Review, Partisan Review, Poetry, Triquarterly, and New England Review.

Family
He lives with his wife, Hilary, and their two children, Charlotte and Ethan, in Lexington, Massachusetts.

Awards
 2014 Massachusetts Cultural Council Artist Fellowship
 2005 Sheila Motton Prize from the New England Poetry Club, for Goodbye to the Orchard
 2005 Honor Book in Poetry by the Massachusetts Center for the Book, for Goodbye to the Orchard
2005 L.A. Times Book Prize Nominee, for Goodbye to the Orchard
 1984 National Endowment for the Arts Fellowship
1983 Massachusetts Artists Foundation Fellowship

Works
 
 
 
 
 
 Listen . MadHat Press. 2020. 978-1-952335-08-2

Reviews
“In his sixth collection of poetry, Steven Cramer, founder of the Lesley University MFA program, looks at and through the fogs of memory and depression. In Listen, Cramer tries to distill a ‘bedlam of thought.’ He is, by turns, matter of fact, nailing the sometimes-funny sometimes-sad absurdity of the world. . . [a]nd warmly sensual.”—Nina McLaughlin, The Boston Globe
“Wrenched word combinations arise out of using sound in this way: Obituary magi, greener chameleon, turquoise girls, blue-sprained boys, head’s high beams, glittering snow loaves, glister of venom, seraph cigarette . . . combinations that make our hearts beat faster, our synapses glow.”—Trena Machado, New Pages
“[Clangings is] one of our favorite poetry books of 2012”—Memorious 
“Clangings is more than wordplay and clever riffs. . . . Language separates us, language connects us—our demise, our opportunity. Cramer’s book brings us full circle to self—who am I without language? Clangings reverberates.”—Lisa C. Krueger, Poets’ Quarterly  
"Steven Cramer's fourth book of poems, Goodbye to the Orchard, provides page after page of graceful inquisition and controlled musicality."—Shrode Hargis, Harvard Review
"Cramer’s poems fight sentiment with our only available weapons: knowledge and integrity."—H.L. Hix, Ploughshares

Anthologies
 Daniel Lawless, ed. (2014). The Plume Anthology of Poetry. MadHat Press. 
Annie Finch and Marie-Elizabeth Mali, eds. (2012). Villanelles.  Knopf: Everyman's Library Pocket Poets Series.  
Michael Simms, ed. (2001). The Autumn House Anthology of Contemporary American Poetry, 2nd Edition. Autumn House Press.

References

External links
 Author's website
 Reviews of Steven Cramer's books
 Poems by Steven Cramer published online

1953 births
Living people
American male poets
Antioch College alumni
People from Lexington, Massachusetts
People from Orange, New Jersey
University of Iowa alumni